In geometry, the perpendicular bisector construction of a quadrilateral is a construction which produces a new quadrilateral from a given quadrilateral using the perpendicular bisectors to the sides of the former quadrilateral. This construction arises naturally in an attempt to find a replacement for the circumcenter of a quadrilateral in the case that is non-cyclic.

Definition of the construction
Let  be the perpendicular bisectors of sides  respectively. Then their intersections , with subscripts considered modulo 4, form the consequent quadrilateral .

Properties
1. If  is not cyclic, then  is not degenerate.

2. Quadrilateral  is never cyclic. Combining #1 and #2,  is always nondegenrate.

3.

3. The perpendicular bisector construction can be reversed via isogonal conjugation. That is, given , it is possible to construct .

4.

 

5. Similarly, if  is concave, then the sequence  obtained by reversing the construction converges to the Isoptic Point of the 's.

References

 J. Langr, Problem E1050, Amer. Math. Monthly, 60 (1953) 551.
 V. V. Prasolov, Plane Geometry Problems, vol. 1 (in Russian), 1991; Problem 6.31.
 V. V. Prasolov, Problems in Plane and Solid Geometry, vol. 1 (translated by D. Leites), available at http://students.imsa.edu/~tliu/math/planegeo.eps.
 D. Bennett, Dynamic geometry renews interest in an old problem, in Geometry Turned On, (ed. J. King), MAA Notes 41, 1997, pp. 25–28.
 J. King, Quadrilaterals formed by perpendicular bisectors, in Geometry Turned On, (ed. J. King), MAA Notes 41, 1997, pp. 29–32.
 G. C. Shephard, The perpendicular bisector construction, Geom. Dedicata, 56 (1995) 75–84.
 A. Bogomolny, Quadrilaterals formed by perpendicular bisectors, Interactive Mathematics Miscellany and Puzzles, http://www.cut-the-knot.org/Curriculum/Geometry/PerpBisectQuadri.shtml.
  B. Grünbaum, On  quadrangles  derived  from quadrangles—Part 3, Geombinatorics 7(1998), 88–94.
 O. Radko and E. Tsukerman, The Perpendicular Bisector Construction, the Isoptic Point and the Simson Line of a Quadrilateral, Forum Geometricorum 12: 161–189 (2012).

Quadrilaterals